Bienvenue Shaka (born 29 December 1999) is a Burundian professional footballer who plays as a forward for AFC Leopards.

References

External links

1999 births
Living people
Burundian footballers
Association football forwards
Étoile Sportive du Sahel players
Tunisian Ligue Professionnelle 1 players
Burundi under-20 international footballers